Captain Black is a brand of aromatic pipe tobaccos produced in Denmark and sold exclusively in the United States by Lane Limited which is a part of the Scandinavian Tobacco Group. A selection of cigars and cigarillos are also produced under the Captain Black name.

Varieties

Pipe tobacco
Available in 1.5oz pouches and 7oz tins.
White
Gold
Copper (Discontinued)
Royal
Light (Discontinued)
Cherry
Grape (Discontinued)
Round Taste (Discontinued)
Dark
Red Sky (Discontinued)
Midnight Gold (Discontinued)
The Black Sea (Discontinued)

Cigarillos
Available in singles, 3-packs, and 20-packs.
Classic
Dark
Sweet
Grape
Cherry
Switch

Tipped cigars
Available in singles and packs of 5.
Original filter tip
Vanilla filter tip
Cherry filter tip

References

External links
Captain Black Cigars
Image of Packets of Captain Black Pipe Tobacco 
Aromatic Tobacco: Little Cigars

Cigar brands
Pipe tobacco brands